Akbar's Garden is an outdoor 1983–1984 aluminum sculpture by Lee Kelly, installed at the University of Oregon campus in Eugene, Oregon, in the United States.

Description and history

Lee Kelly's Akbar's Garden (1984) is a  tooled aluminum sculpture installed in Straub Quadrangle, across from the Student Recreation Center, on the University of Oregon campus. The work was donated by art collector and philanthropist Jordan D. Schnitzer and his parents Harold and Arlene Schnitzer in 2002. Before then, it was installed at the Claremont Hotel in Berkeley California. According to the Jordan Schnitzer Family Foundation, Akbar's Garden commemorates the "Oregon Campaign" that raised more than $225 million for the University between 1992 and 1998.

See also

 1984 in art

References

External links

 Akbar's Garden abstract sculpture at the University of Oregon in Eugene, Oregon at dcMemorials.com
 Akbar's Garden by Lee Kelly - University of Oregon, Eugene, OR at Waymarking

1984 sculptures
Aluminum sculptures in Oregon
Outdoor sculptures in Eugene, Oregon
Sculptures by Lee Kelly
University of Oregon campus